"Fear Inoculum" is a song by American rock band Tool. The song was released as the title track and lead single from their fifth studio album Fear Inoculum. It was released on August 7, 2019, the first new Tool song since the release of their previous album 10,000 Days. Upon its debut on the Billboard Hot 100, "Fear Inoculum" broke the Guinness World Record for the longest song ever to chart on the  Hot 100, overtaking David Bowie's "Blackstar".

Reception
Loudwire described the song as having "Middle Eastern drum patterns" and called it a "slow burn building to big, cathartic crescendos". They also praised Keenan's vocals, noting the lyrics "seem to address a rejection of fear and negativity from outside sources." Loudersound described the song as "a lengthy, polyrhythmic song that slowly reveals its secrets. A carefully calculated trip that nevertheless hits emotional pressure points." Metalsucks praised the song's mixing, Carey's drumming and Jones's guitar tone. It was nominated for Best Rock Song at the 2020 Grammy Awards.

Chart performance
The song debuted at number 93 on the Billboard Hot 100, the band's first entry since "Schism" in 2001, and became the longest song in the chart's history to make an entry, breaking the record held by David Bowie's "Blackstar". It debuted on the Billboard Top Rock Songs chart at number 4 on the August 17 release.

Personnel
 Maynard James Keenan – vocals
 Adam Jones – guitar
 Justin Chancellor – bass
 Danny Carey – drums, percussion

Charts

Weekly charts

Year-end charts

References

2019 songs
2019 singles
Tool (band) songs
Songs written by Maynard James Keenan
Songs written by Danny Carey
Songs written by Justin Chancellor
Songs written by Adam Jones (musician)